Ágúst or Agust is a given name. Notable people with the name include:

Ágúst Björgvinsson (born 1979), Icelandic basketball coach
Ágúst Þór Jóhannsson (born 1977), Icelandic team handball player and coach 
Ágúst Ævar Gunnarsson, (born 1976), founding member of the Icelandic post-rock band Sigur Rós
Ágúst Guðmundsson (born 1947), Icelandic filmmaker
Ágúst Gylfason (born 1971), Icelandic footballer, currently playing for Fjölnir
Ágúst H. Bjarnason (1875–1952), pioneer in teaching psychology in Iceland
Daníel Ágúst Haraldsson (born 1969), Icelandic singer-songwriter, lead-singer of the bands GusGus and Esja, formerly of the band Ný Dönsk
Ágúst Pálsson (1893–1967), Icelandic architect

Icelandic masculine given names